The 2017–18 1. FC Union Berlin season is the 52nd season in the football club's history and 8th consecutive season in the second division of German football, the 2. Bundesliga and 12th overall. In addition to the domestic league, 1. FC Union Berlin also are participating in this season's edition of the domestic cup, the DFB-Pokal. This is the 52nd season for 1. FC Union Berlin in the Stadion An der Alten Försterei, located in Köpenick, Berlin, Germany. The season covers a period from 1 July 2017 to 30 June 2018.

Players

Squad information

Transfers

Summer

In:

Out:

Winter

In:

Out:

Matches

Legend

Friendly matches

2. Bundesliga

League table

Results summary

Results by round

Matches

DFB-Pokal

Squad and statistics

! colspan="13" style="background:#DCDCDC; text-align:center" | Players transferred out during the season
|-

|}

Notes

References

1. FC Union Berlin seasons
Berlin, Union